The Trans–São Francisco languages (Portuguese: Transanfranciscano) are a proposed grouping of languages within  Macro-Jê. They consist of the Krenák, Maxakalían, and possibly also the Kamakã families. The Trans–São Francisco group was originally proposed and demonstrated by Nikulin and Silva (2020) under the name of Maxakalí-Krenák.

They are named after the São Francisco River of Northeast Brazil.

Classification
Internal classification of Trans–São Francisco by Nikulin (2020):

Krenák (Borum)
Maxakalían
Malalí
Nuclear Maxakalían
Maxakalí
Ritual Maxakalí; Makoní
Pataxó; Pataxó-Hãhãhãe
Koropó
? Kamakã (possibly part of Trans–São Francisco)
Masakará
Southern Kamakã
Menien
Kamakã; Kotoxó/Mongoyó

Proto-language

Proto-Trans–São Francisco has been reconstructed by Nikulin (2020), while there is also a Proto-Kamakã reconstruction by Martins (2007).

See also
Macro-Jê languages
Kariri languages#Other languages called 'Kariri'
List of unclassified languages of South America#Northeast Brazil

Further reading
Nikulin, Andrey and Mário André Coelho da Silva. As línguas Maxakalí e Krenák dentro do tronco Macro-Jê. Cadernos de Etnolingüística (ISSN 1946-7095), (8)1:1-64.

References

Macro-Jê languages
Indigenous languages of Northeastern Brazil
Proposed language families